Brownie, Browny, or brownies may refer to:

Foods
 Chocolate brownie, a baked good

People

People with the given name
 Brownie Samukai, Minister of National Defence of Liberia
 Brownie Wise (1913–1992), developer of the party plan system of marketing for Tupperware

People with the surname
 Cavell Brownie, American statistician

Fictional characters 
 Brownie, a fictional character in Ace Combat 7 : Skies Unknown

People with the nickname
 Clifford Brown (1930–1956), American jazz trumpeter
 Ernest Brown (dancer) (1916–2009), African-American tap dancer
 Lewis Brown (rugby league) (born 1986), New Zealand footballer
 Luke Brown (footballer, born 1992), Australian rules footballer
 Michael D. Brown, U.S. undersecretary of emergency preparedness and response
 Vernon Brown (musician) (1907–1979), American trombonist
 Brownie Foreman (1875–1926), Major League Baseball pitcher
 Browny Igboegwu (born 1976), Nigerian actor
 Brownie Ledbetter (1932–2010), political activist
 Brownie McGhee (1915–1996), blues musician
 Agnes Vernon (1895–1948), American actress

Arts, entertainment, and media
 Brownie (folklore), a legendary creature
 Brownie (guitar), a Fender Stratocaster used by Eric Clapton in the 1970s
 Brownie (sculpture), a 1905 bronze by Louis Amateis at the Houston Zoo, Texas, US
 Brownies (film), a 2004 Indonesian film by Hanung Bramantyo
 Brownies (web series), Indian American web comic
 The Brownies, a series of publications by Palmer Cox,  1879 onwards
 Brownies (company), video game developer formerly known as Brownie Brown

Brands and enterprises
 Brownie (camera), a popular inexpensive camera made by Eastman Kodak
 Bristol Brownie, a light sports airplane
 Brownie Chocolate Drink, a U.S. soft drink
 Mossberg Brownie, a pistol
 St. Louis, Brownsville and Mexico Railway, or the Brownie

Other uses
 Brownie, Kentucky, a former unincorporated community now part of Central City
 Algona Brownies, a baseball team in Algona, Iowa, United States
 Brownie points, an imaginary social currency
 Brownies (Scouting), a level in several Guiding/Scouting organizations
 Brownie, a level in Woodcraft Indians scouting for girls and boys ages 6–11
 Diplacus douglasii or brownies, a species of plant
 Miletus (butterfly) or brownies, a genus of butterflies

See also
 
 
 Blondie (confection), a brownie made without chocolate
 Brown (disambiguation)

Lists of people by nickname